Malbaza Uzine is a town in southwestern Niger. It is near the city of Tahoua.

Populated places in Niger